Salvatore "Toto" D'Aquila (November 7, 1873 – October 10, 1928) was an early Italian-American Mafia  boss in New York City of the D'Aquila crime family, what would later become known as the Gambino crime family.

Early life and career 
Salvatore D'Aquila was born on November 7, 1873 in Palermo, Sicily to Salvatore D'Aquila and his wife Provvidenza Gagliardo. D'Aquila emigrated to the United States in 1906 and became an early captain within the Morello crime family in East Harlem. D'Aquila was arrested in 1906 and in 1909; both times the charges were dropped. In 1910, boss of bosses Giuseppe "the Clutch Hand" Morello was imprisoned and Salvatore D'Aquila separated from the Morello family. D'Aquila formed his own crime family and was appointed the new capo dei capi. His crime family operated from East Harlem and the Bronx, where he rivaled the Morellos'.

D'Aquila expanded his crime family's power into Brooklyn and southern Manhattan's Lower East Side/Little Italy neighborhoods. The most prominent members of the D'Aquila family were Umberto Valenti, Manfredi Mineo, Giuseppe Traina, and Frank Scalise. In 1920, after Giuseppe Morello was released from prison, D'Aquila tried to have him and his closest allies murdered. In 1925, D'Aquila moved back into the Bronx.

Death 
On October 10, 1928, D'Aquila was shot dead on Avenue A in Manhattan, aged 54. After his murder, D'Aquila's family was taken over by Manfredi Mineo.

See also 

 Black Hand (extortion)

References 
Citations

Sources

External links 
 D'Aquila biography on The American Mafia website
 La Cosa Nostra Database "Salvatore D'Aquila"
 
 Struggle for Control – The Gangs of New York, article by Jon Black at GangRule.com
 1928 D'Aquila photos

1873 births
1928 deaths
Bosses of the Gambino crime family
Burials at St. John's Cemetery (Queens)
Capo dei capi
Deaths by firearm in Manhattan
Murdered American gangsters of Sicilian descent
Gangsters from Palermo
People murdered in New York City
Male murder victims
Prohibition-era gangsters
1928 murders in the United States
Italian emigrants to the United States